Fissicrambus verselias is a moth in the family Crambidae. It was described by Stanisław Błeszyński in 1963. It is found in Colombia.

References

Crambini
Moths described in 1963
Moths of South America